The 2009 1. divisjon (referred to as Adeccoligaen for sponsorship reasons) was a Norwegian second-tier football season. The season began play on 5 April 2009 and will end on 1 November 2009.

The club relegated from the Tippeligaen in 2008 was Ham-Kam. Sandnes Ulf and Hødd were relegated to the 2. divisjon in 2008 after finishing in fifteenth and sixteenth place respectively. Tromsdalen, Stavanger, Mjøndalen, and Skeid were promoted from the 2. divisjon in 2008.

At the end of the season, a two-legged promotion playoff will be played between the 3rd, 4th, and 5th placed teams in the 1. divisjon and the 14th placed team in the Tippeligaen.

League table

Results

Promotion play-offs

The two winning sides from the first round, Sarpsborg 08 and Kongsvinger, took part in a two-legged play-off to decide who would play in the 2010 Tippeligaen.

First leg

Second leg

Kongsvinger won 5–4 on aggregate and were promoted to the 2010 Tippeligaen.

Top goalscorers 

Last updated: 1 November 2009Source: NRK Sport

See also
2009 Tippeligaen

References

Norwegian First Division seasons
2
Norway
Norway